Kim Jin-hyun may refer to:

Kim Jin-hyeon (born 6 July 1987), South Korean football goalkeeper
Kim Jin-hyun (footballer, born in Haenam) (born 29 July 1987), South Korean football defender
Kim Jin-hyun (footballer, born 1999), South Korean footballer